The Clatsop are an ethnic group native to the US state of Oregon. Clatsop may also refer to:

Geography
Clatsop County, Oregon, a county in northwestern Oregon
Clatsop Butte, an upland butte in Portland, Oregon
Clatsop Mission, a Methodist station
Clatsop Plains, an area of wetlands and sand dunes in Oregon
Clatsop Spit, a large sand spit off the coast of Oregon
Clatsop State Forest, an Oregon state forest
Fort Clatsop, an encampment of the Lewis and Clark expedition in modern-day Oregon

Other uses
Clatsop Community College, a community college in Clatsop County